Ralston Crawford (1906–1978) was an American abstract painter, lithographer, and photographer.

Early life
He was born on September 5, 1906, in St. Catharines, Ontario, and spent his childhood in Buffalo, New York. He studied art beginning in 1927 in California at the Otis Art Institute. After working at the Walt Disney Studio, he returned to the eastern U.S. for further study at the Pennsylvania Academy of the Fine Arts, and at the Barnes Foundation, where he was exposed to the art of Picasso and Matisse. In 1934, he had his first one-man showing at the Maryland Institute College of Art.

Work
Crawford was best known for his abstract representations of urban life and industry. His early work placed him with Precisionist artists like Niles Spencer and Charles Sheeler.  Here, the focus was on realistic, sharp portrayals of factories, bridges, and shipyards.  Later work was geometrically abstract.  In Spain, he observed bullfighting, and the religious procession during Holy Week in Seville. In New Orleans, he painted and photographed  cemeteries and jazz musicians (requiring a permit to visit bars normally restricted to blacks). Fortune Magazine sent Crawford to the Bikini Atoll in 1946 to record a nuclear weapons test.

During his abstract period, he said, "I don't feel obligated to reveal the forms.  They may be totally absent to the viewer of the work, or even to myself, but what is there, however abstract, grows out of something I have seen. I make pictures."

Death
On April 27, 1978, Crawford died of cancer in Houston, Texas, survived by his wife Peggy (1917–2015) and three children (Neelan, John and Robert). At that time, his works were included in the public collections of the Honolulu Museum of Art, the Metropolitan Museum of Art, the Museum of Modern Art, the Whitney Museum of American Art, the Walker Art Center, and the Toledo Museum of Art. Crawford is buried in St. Louis Cemetery No. 3 in New Orleans, a short distance from one of the Catholic cemeteries in which he produced many of his works.

His wife, a founder of the Modern Art Society, which would later become the Contemporary Arts Center in Cincinnati, Ohio, died April 18, 2015.

Permanent collections
The Addison Gallery of American Art (Andover, Massachusetts), the Clay Center for the Arts and Sciences (Charleston, West Virginia), the Fred Jones Jr. Museum of Art (University of Oklahoma); the Georgia Museum of Art (University of Georgia); Harvard University Art Museums, the Hirshhorn Museum and Sculpture Garden (Washington D.C.), the Honolulu Museum of Art, the J. Paul Getty Museum (Los Angeles), the Museum of Fine Arts, Boston, the James A. Michener Art Museum (Doylestown, Pennsylvania), the Kemper Museum of Contemporary Art (Kansas City, Missouri), the Kresge Art Museum (Michigan State University), the Los Angeles County Museum of Art, the Mead Art Museum (Amherst College), the Museum of Modern Art (New York City), the Saint Louis Art Museum, the National Gallery of Art (Washington D.C.), the Norton Museum of Art (West Palm Beach, Florida), The Phillips Collection (Washington D.C), the San Francisco Museum of Modern Art, the Smithsonian American Art Museum (Washington D.C.), the Tweed Museum of Art (University of Minnesota, Duluth), the Walker Art Center (Minnesota), the Utah Museum of Fine Arts (Salt Lake City), the Cincinnati Art Museum (Cincinnati, Ohio), the Munson-Williams-Proctor Arts Institute (Utica, New York), and the Whitney Museum of American Art Jule Collins Smith Museum of Fine Art(Auburn University, Alabama),(New York City) are among the public collections holding work by Ralston Crawford.

References 

 Colta Ives; Janet S. Byrne; Suzanne Boorsch; Maria Morris Hambourg; David W. Kiehl. Recent Acquisitions (Metropolitan Museum of Art), No. 1985/1986. (1985–1986), 41

Further reading
Agee, W.C. (1983). Ralston Crawford. Pasadena, CA: Twelvetrees Press.
Freeman, R.B. (1962). The Lithographs of Ralston Crawford. Lexington: University of Kentucky Press.
Freeman, R.B. (1973). Graphics '73 : Ralston Crawford . Lexington: University of Kentucky Press.
Harnsberger, R.S. (1992). Ten precisionist artists : annotated bibliographies [Art Reference Collection no. 14]. Westport, CT: Greenwood Press.
Haskell, B. (1985). Ralston Crawford. New York: Whitney Museum of American Art.
Hirschl & Adler Galleries. (1991). Ralston Crawford and the sea. New York: author.
Hirschl & Adler Galleries. (1993). Ralston Crawford: images of war. New York: author.

1906 births
1978 deaths
20th-century American painters
American male painters
Modern painters
20th-century American photographers
Precisionism
Otis College of Art and Design alumni
Pennsylvania Academy of the Fine Arts alumni
Canadian emigrants to the United States
Artists from Buffalo, New York
Artists from St. Catharines
Painters from New York (state)
Deaths from cancer in Texas
20th-century American male artists